V O Chidambaranar park and zoo (abbreviated VOC park) is a zoological garden and amusement park located in Coimbatore, Tamil Nadu, India. As of 2013, the park houses around 890 animals including 335 birds, 106 mammals and 54 reptiles. The park is named after freedom fighter V O Chidambaram Pillai and is managed by Coimbatore city Corporation.

Park and grounds

There is a park, children's play area and ground associated with the zoo. The park also has a toy train, Jurassic Park and aquarium.  The grounds are used for conducting fairs and events including the annual Independence day and Republic day celebrations. The park has over 200 species of trees including Sandalwood. A rosy pelican hatchling was born in the zoo after 14 yrs, this species is known to have a low fertility rate.

Exhibits
The park has 29 species of mammals, birds including rosy pelican, Sarus Crane, Adjutant Stork, night heron and reptiles. 

Animals at the park as of 31 March 2017 include:

Gallery

References

Amusement parks in Tamil Nadu
Tourist attractions in Coimbatore
Zoos in Tamil Nadu